Lorenzo Priuli (1537–1600) was a Roman Catholic cardinal and Patriarch of Venice.  Like many Venetian patriarchs, he was a lay member of the Venetian Senate, who was only ordained in 1590, at the age of 54, after he won the Senate's election to fill the patriarchy. Previously he had been a successful Venetian diplomat and governor.

In the last centuries of the Republic of Venice (to 1797), exceptionally among Catholic bishops, the patriarch was elected by the Venetian Senate, who  always chose a member of one of the hereditary patrician families of the city, and usually a layman who was only ordained to take up the patriarchate.  The papacy obliged them to pass an examination in theology, though many evaded this.  Usually the new patriarch was a Venetian diplomat or administrator, as with Lorenzo Priuli in 1591 or Francesco Vendramin in 1608, though some were career clerics, who had usually been previously in positions in Rome, like Federico Cornaro in 1631.

Biography
He came from a senatorial family, and made his career as a successful Venetian diplomat, serving as ambassador to Spain, France, and the Holy See.  On 25 Jan 1591, he was consecrated bishop by Marcello Acquaviva, Archbishop of Otranto.
While bishop, he was the principal consecrator of Johann Walser, Titular Bishop of Belline and Auxiliary Bishop of Brixen (1592); and the principal co-consecrator of Ferdinando D'Avila, Bishop of Rethymo (1592).

References

Ferraro, Joanne M., Marriage Wars in Late Renaissance Venice, 2001, Oxford University Press, 9780198033110, google books

1537 births
1600 deaths
16th-century Italian cardinals
Patriarchs of Venice
Republic of Venice diplomats
16th-century Venetian people